Guy Joachim (born 1955) is a Haitian painter. Born in Cap-Haïtien, Joachim is known for his paintings of historical scenes. His works have been exhibited in Germany, the United States, the Dominican Republic, and France.

Paintings

References

 
 
 

1955 births
Haitian painters
Haitian male painters
Living people
People from Cap-Haïtien